Thomas Werner or Tom Werner may refer to:

Thomas Werner, German youth who committed suicide in an all male gymnasium, inspiring The Heart of Thomas, a 1974 Japanese manga series written and illustrated by Moto Hagio
Thomas Werner Laurie (1866–1944), London publisher of books 
Tom Werner, or Thomas Charles Werner (born 1950), American television producer and businessman
Tom Preston-Werner (born 1979), American billionaire software developer and entrepreneur and CEO of GitHub

See also
Werner Thomas, Swiss accordionist